Rose Musani (born 8 August 1956) is a Ugandan sprinter. She competed in the women's 200 metres at the 1972 Summer Olympics.

References

1956 births
Living people
Athletes (track and field) at the 1972 Summer Olympics
Ugandan female sprinters
Olympic athletes of Uganda
Place of birth missing (living people)
Olympic female sprinters